Andra is an Australian children's television series based on the book of the same name, which was broadcast on the ABC Television. The series consists of eight episodes of 30 minute. It had such a small budget that in the background, in crowd scenes, the 'crowd' is actually made up of store clothing dummies. The sets, instead of containing items of furniture, or other articles, are large white blocks piled up on each other.

The series targets a female audience but a similar Australian science fiction series, Alpha Scorpio was made a little earlier in the 1970s and aimed at a male audience.

Cast 
 Lisa Peers as Andra
 Robert Hewett as Syrd
 Jonathan Hardy as Shenlyn
 Bruce Kerr as Lazcaux
 Suzanne Dudley as Cromer

Episodes

References

External links
 
Andra TV series at AustLit (subscription required)

Australian children's television series
1976 Australian television series debuts
1976 Australian television series endings
Australian science fiction television series
Australian Broadcasting Corporation original programming